Eublemma amabilis is a moth of the family Noctuidae first described by Saalmüller in 1891. It is found in India, Bangladesh and Sri Lanka.

The adult is white pinkish. Eggs are round and grey white. First instars are creamy whitish with a broad flat head.

It is a major pest on Kerria lacca. The caterpillar enters the lac insect through one of the openings in the test or by tunnelling a hole through the incrustation. Pupa obtect adecticous and dark brown.

References

External links
Control of Eublemma amabilis Moore (Noctuidae: Lepidoptera) and Holcocera pulverea Meyr (Blastobasidae; Lepidoptera), predators of the lac insect Kerria lacca (Kerr) by Bacillus thurgiensis Berliner
Acidity in the Gut of Eublemma amabilis Larvae—a Predator of the Lac Insect
A note on sex pheromone gland of Eublemma amabilis Moore

Moths of Asia
Moths described in 1891
Boletobiinae